The Hispaniolan tailspot sphaero (Sphaerodactylus epiurus) is a species of lizard in the family 

Sphaerodactylidae. It is endemic to the Dominican Republic.

References

Sphaerodactylus
Reptiles of the Dominican Republic
Endemic fauna of the Dominican Republic
Reptiles described in 1993
Taxa named by Stephen Blair Hedges
Taxa named by Richard Thomas (herpetologist)